Tony Hans Mårtensson (born June 23, 1980) is a Swedish former professional ice hockey center. He was born in Upplands Väsby, Sweden.

Playing career 
Mårtensson was drafted by the Mighty Ducks of Anaheim in the 2001 NHL Entry Draft in the 7th round as the 224th pick overall. He only played in six games with the Mighty Ducks during the 2003–04 season, scoring two points. Since season 2004–05 he has played for Linköpings HC in the Swedish elite league Elitserien. During the Elitserien season 2007–08 he won the league with most points (67) and most assists (50); and was also awarded Guldhjälmen as the most valuable player in the league during the regular season.

For the 2008–09 season, Mårtensson was on a ten-month loan to the Russian team Ak Bars Kazan of the Kontinental Hockey League (KHL), helping claim the KHL championship.

After five seasons with SKA St. Petersburg, capturing his second Gagarin Cup title in the 2014–15 season,  Mårtensson agreed to a two-year contract with Swiss club, HC Lugano, on May 5, 2015.

Career statistics

Regular season and playoffs

International

Awards 
 Gold medal at the World Championship in 2006.
 Awarded Guldhjälmen in 2008.

References

External links 

 

1980 births
Living people
Ak Bars Kazan players
Almtuna IS players
Anaheim Ducks draft picks
Brynäs IF players
Cincinnati Mighty Ducks players
Expatriate ice hockey players in Russia
Linköping HC players
HC Lugano players
Mighty Ducks of Anaheim players
People from Upplands Väsby Municipality
SKA Saint Petersburg players
Swedish expatriate sportspeople in Russia
Swedish expatriate ice hockey players in the United States
Swedish ice hockey centres
Sportspeople from Stockholm County